i-Space—also known as Space Honor, Beijing Interstellar Glory Space Technology Ltd., Interstellar Glory or StarCraft Glory—is a Chinese private space technology development and space launch company based in Beijing, founded in October 2016.

The company is developing two-stage small satellite orbital launchers based on  solid propellant rocket engines procured from major Chinese government supplier China Aerospace Science and Technology Corporation (CAST).

In July 2019, i-Space successfully launched the Hyperbola-1 and reached low Earth orbit on its maiden flight, becoming the first private company from China to achieve orbit. A second launch of the Hyperbola-1 in February 2021 failed to reach orbit, as did the third attempt in August 2021 and the fourth in May 2022.

History 
The company was founded in 2016.

By 2019, i-Space had successfully launched the Hyperbola-1S and Hyperbola-1Z single-stage solid-propellant test rockets into space on suborbital test flights, and then reached low Earth orbit with Hyperbola-1 on its maiden flight on 25 July 2019, becoming the first private company from China to have achieved orbit. The dummy payload for that maiden flight was a Changan Oshan X7 SUV, making it the second car to ever reach space.

The company raised  in private capital in a series B round during 2020.

Rockets

Suborbital rockets: Hyperbola-1S and Hyperbola-1Z 
The Hyperbola-1S (also called SQX-1S), and the Hyperbola-1Z (also called SQX-1Z), are single stage, solid-propellant suborbital test rockets.

The second flight of i-Space was a commercial sub-orbital flight launched on 5 September 2018 from the Jiuquan Satellite Launch Center in the Gobi desert, using the Hyperbola-1Z rocket. It carried  payloads from private Chinese satellite companies ZeroG Labs and ADA-space. The rocket delivered three CubeSat satellites one of which subsequently parachuted back to Earth.

Hyperbola-1 
It consists of four all solid fuel stages, guided by liquid fuel attitude control engines. It can launch  into low Earth orbit (LEO). The rocket might be based on Chinese military missiles (perhaps DF-11 or DF-15). The first stage of the rocket is equipped with four grid fins. The launch price is reported around US$5 million.

Its successful maiden flight was on 25 July 2019, at 05:00 UTC from Jiuquan Satellite Launch Center. It launched from a movable supporting platform. CAS-7B decayed from orbit 6 August 2019. It was the first Chinese private company to achieve orbit (orbital launches of other private companies before had failed).

A second launch occurred on 1 February 2021, at 08:15 UTC (16:15 Beijing Time) from Jiuquan Satellite Launch Center with 6 unidentified satellites but failed to reach orbit. A subsequent investigation revealed that a piece of insulation had broken off and got stuck in the turning mechanism of grid fin Number IV. When the piece was blown away, the control system then suddenly overcompensated, resulting in the rocket being ripped apart by excessive aerodynamic forces. The rocket was named "Tianshu" because its outer fuselage was covered with the artistic creations (images of compound made-up Chinese characters) of the contemporary artist Xu Bing.

iSpace launched a third Hyperbola-1 solid-rocket vehicle on 3 August 2021. SpaceNews was reporting the same day that the outcome of the launch was unknown, but that amateur video of the launch had been posted, but then deleted from Chinese social media. After most of the day had passed, the Chinese official media Xinhua reported that the launch was unsuccessful due to off-nominal performance of the rocket which resulted in a failure to achieve orbit. An official statement released by the company itself the following day clarified that the failure was caused by a malfunctioning in the fairing separation process, that precluded the payload from reaching the target orbit.

A fourth launch attempt on May 13th 2022 was unsuccessful as well.

Hyperbola-2 
The Hyperbola-2 (Chinese: 双曲线二号) is a two-stage, liquid-fueled, reusable rocket designed to be able lift 1.9 tons into LEO. It uses liquid oxygen and methane as fuel. The first stage is expected to land propulsively in order to be reused. The JD-1 engine made its first hot fire test in May 2020. As of July 2022, the first launch is expected to occur in 2023 following a series of first stage hop tests.

Other developments 
In May 2018, i-Space indicated they hoped to eventually develop a reusable sub-orbital spaceplane (Chinese: 亚轨道概念飞行器) for space tourism.

Marketplace 
i-Space is in competition with several other Chinese space rocket startups, being LandSpace, Galactic Energy, ExPace, LinkSpace, OneSpace and Deep Blue Aerospace.

See also 

 OneSpace, a Chinese company competitor
 Space Pioneer, a Chinese competitor privately developing liquid rocket engine technology and launch vehicles

References 

Private spaceflight companies
Aerospace companies of China
Commercial launch service providers
Companies based in Beijing
Chinese companies established in 2016